Raccordo autostradale 14 (RA 14), also referred to as RA-Diramazione per Fernetti, is a motorway which connects the Raccordo autostradale RA13 near Opicina with the border of Fernetti. At the border, the junction engages seamlessly with the Slovenian A3 motorway, which passes close to Sesana and engages, at Divaccia, with the Slovenian A1 Motorway, which ends in Ljubljana.

References 

RA14
Transport in Friuli-Venezia Giulia